State Route 187, also known as SR 187, is a state highway in south-central Arizona traveling from State Route 387 north of Casa Grande north to its junction with State Route 87 near Sacaton. It is a short-cut for traffic heading toward the southeast valley of Phoenix in case of an accident on westbound Interstate 10.

The stretch between Interstate 10 and Casa Grande was historically/originally part of SR 187; it is now part of SR 387.

Route description
The southern terminus of SR 187 is located at an intersection with SR 387 northeast of the interchange between I-10 and SR 387.  SR 187 heads northeast from this junction to an intersection with the Casa Grande Highway.  It continues towards the northeast to its northern terminus at an intersection with SR 87.

History
The route was established in 1927 by the Arizona Department of Transportation and originally ended at State Route 84 over a former portion of State Route 87, which was rerouted to the east. The road was improved several times until it was completely paved in 1966. Between 1958 and 1963, the section between SR 84 and SR 387 was transferred to SR 93, a proposed extension of US 93.

Junction list

References

External links

SR 187 at Arizona Roads

187
Transportation in Pinal County, Arizona
Gila River Indian Community